Florida's 46th House District elects one member of the Florida House of Representatives. 
Its current representative is Democrat Bruce Antone.

Representatives from 1967 to the present

See also 
 List of members of the Florida House of Representatives from Brevard County, Florida

References

46
History of Brevard County, Florida